Route 345 is a provincial highway located in the Lanaudière region of Quebec. It runs from the junction of Route 158 in Sainte-Geneviève-de-Berthier and ends at the junction of Route 131 in Saint-Felix-de-Valois.

Municipalities along Route 345
 Sainte-Geneviève-de-Berthier
 Sainte-Elizabeth
 Saint-Félix-de-Valois

Major intersections

See also
 List of Quebec provincial highways

References

External links 
 Transport Quebec official map 
 Route 345 on Google Maps

345
Roads in Lanaudière